In the United States, the plain view doctrine is an exception to the Fourth Amendment's warrant requirement that allows an officer to seize evidence and contraband that are found in plain view during a lawful observation. The doctrine is also regularly used by Transportation Security Administration (TSA) officers while screening persons and property at U.S. airports.

For the plain view doctrine to apply for discoveries, the three-prong Horton test requires that:
 The officer is lawfully present at the place where the evidence can be plainly viewed 
 The officer has a lawful right of access to the object 
 The incriminating character of the object is immediately apparent

Development
The plain view doctrine was first articulated in Coolidge v. New Hampshire. The original formulation included three factors. First, the officer must be lawfully present where (s)he viewed the evidence or contraband.  Second, the officer must immediately (without further search) have probable cause to believe the item is either contraband or evidence of a crime. Third, the observation must have been "inadvertent," not anticipated or intended by the officer before the sighting.

In Horton v. California the court eliminated the requirement that the discovery of evidence in plain view be inadvertent, which had led to difficulties in defining "inadvertent discovery." In Horton, the Supreme Court upheld the plain view seizure of weapons related to a robbery despite the judge who authorized the warrant specifically declining the officer's request for permission to seize weapons as part of the search. The Horton ruling also clarified that the officer must have a "lawful right of access" to the objects to seize them under the plain view doctrine. For example, an officer who sees contraband in plain view in someone's home through their window but is not authorized to enter the home cannot rely on the plain view doctrine to enter the home and seize the contraband.

Limitations

For the officer to legally seize the item, the officer must have probable cause to believe the item is evidence of a crime or is contraband. The police may not move objects to get a better view, and they may not be in a location unlawfully. These limitations are illustrated in Arizona v. Hicks, 480 U.S. 321 (1987).

First, this doctrine only eliminates the warrant requirement, not the probable cause requirement. Investigators normally must get a court-issued warrant before seizing property, by presenting enough evidence to a magistrate judge to meet the probable cause requirement. When using the plain view doctrine, investigators must still have the evidence needed to meet the probable cause requirement, they are only exempt from the step of obtaining a warrant from a judge.

Second, the doctrine only authorizes seizure of contraband or evidence. It does not authorize a further search or additional investigation. Therefore, if investigators do not have enough evidence to meet the probable cause requirement, they may not even conduct a relatively nonintrusive search to get probable cause. This is the requirement that the incriminating character of the object must be immediately apparent. In Arizona v. Hicks police officers were in an apartment investigating a shooting and suspected that a record player in the apartment was stolen. The officers could not see the serial number, which was on the bottom of the record player, so they picked the player up and confirmed that it matched the serial number of a record player that had been reported stolen. However, the Supreme Court ruled that picking up the record player constituted an additional search (though a relatively nonintrusive one), because the serial number was not in plain view. This meant that the plain view doctrine didn't apply, and the officers needed a warrant. The evidence of the stolen record player could not be used against the defendant due to the exclusionary rule, which is the remedy available when evidence is obtained in violation of the Fourth Amendment. This gives rise to the third requirement above: that the incriminating character of the object to be "immediately apparent."

Third, the officer must be lawfully present where they see the item. For example, an officer may not enter the suspect's home without a warrant and rely on the plain view doctrine. However, if an officer is inside a suspect's home under an unrelated warrant, he may rely on the plain view doctrine, subject to the doctrine's other requirements. In Arizona v. Hicks, the police officers were in the apartment under another exception to the warrant requirement, exigent circumstances. This qualified as a lawful entry and the plain view doctrine applied to items the officers could see in the apartment.

Sub-doctrines

The plain view doctrine has also been expanded to include the sub-doctrines of plain feel, plain smell, and plain hearing. These doctrines are also limited to seizing an item where its nature as contraband or evidence of a crime is "immediately apparent." In Minnesota v. Dickerson, a police officer felt a lump in a suspect's pocket during a lawful pat down search. He did not immediately have probable cause to believe that it was contraband, but proceeded to inspect it further by squeezing it, and then had probable cause to believe that it was a piece of crack cocaine. The U.S. Supreme Court held that this additional inspection was not covered by the plain view doctrine, and the contraband could not be used against the defendant. The Court's reasoning did, however, extend the "plain view" doctrine to other senses, such as the sense of touch.

Application to Technology

This question typically arises where a government agent is searching under a warrant for one crime, but finds evidence of a different crime. In United States v. Wong police were searching the defendant's computer for evidence related to a murder when they discovered child pornography on the computer. Though the warrant was specific to evidence of the murder, the Ninth Circuit held that the plain view exception allowed them to seize the child pornography, as searching graphics files was valid under the warrant and the files were immediately identifiable as contraband.

However, as with the application of this doctrine elsewhere, the plain view doctrine only justifies a seizure of evidence or contraband that is in plain view. It does not justify a further search. In United States v. Carey a police detective was searching a computer for evidence of drug trafficking. When he opened one .jpg file that turned out to contain child pornography, he proceeded to search for more images and found two hundred and forty four images of child pornography on the computer. The Tenth Circuit held that only the first image was covered by the plain view doctrine, and the rest of the images could not be used against the defendant in court.

See also
Exigent circumstances
Open-fields doctrine
Consent search
Arizona v. Gant (2009)

References

Further reading

RayMing Chang, Why the Plain View Doctrine Should Not Apply to Digital Evidence, 12 Suffolk Journal of Trial and Appellate Advocacy 31 (Spring 2007)